is the fourth live video album by Japanese band Wagakki Band, released on June 21, 2017 by Avex Trax in six editions: 2-disc DVD, single-disc Blu-ray, two Documentary editions, and two Live CD editions. In addition, a mu-mo Shop exclusive release includes all editions and a bonus audio CD. The video covers the band's two-day concert at the Tokyo Metropolitan Gymnasium on February 17–18, 2017.

The video peaked at No. 2 on Oricon's DVD chart and No. 11 on Oricon's Blu-ray chart.

Track listing
All tracks are arranged by Wagakki Band.
All tracks were recorded from the Sakura no Utage show (February 18), except DVD Disc 2 tracks 4–8, which were recorded from the Yuki no Utage show (February 17).

Personnel 
 Yuko Suzuhana – vocals
 Machiya – guitar, vocals ("Episode.0")
 Beni Ninagawa – tsugaru shamisen
 Kiyoshi Ibukuro – koto
 Asa – bass
 Daisuke Kaminaga – shakuhachi
 Wasabi – drums
 Kurona – wadaiko

Charts

References

External links 
 
  (Avex Group)
 
 

Wagakki Band video albums
2017 live albums
Japanese-language live albums
Avex Group live albums
Avex Group video albums